Toba Dreams is an Indonesian film adapted from the novel of the same title essay T.B. Silalahi.

Cast 
 Vino G. Bastian as Ronggur
 Marsha Timothy as Andini
 Mathias Muchus as Sergeant TB Silalahi
 Ajil Ditto as Teddy
 Jajang C. Noer as Opung Boru
 Haykal Kamil as Samurung
 Vinessa Inez as Taruli
 Boris Bokir as Tigor

References

External links 
 
 
 Trailer OFFICIAL

2015 films
Films about religion
2010s Indonesian-language films
Indonesian drama films